Gedu-ye Pain (also Romanized as Gedū-ye Pā’īn and Gedū Pā’īn; also known as Gedū) is a village in Byaban Rural District, Byaban District, Minab County, Hormozgan Province, Iran. At the 2006 census, its population was 200, in 35 families.

References 

Populated places in Minab County